UNEF may refer to:

 United Nations Emergency Force, a UN force deployed in the Middle East in 1956
 UNEF, a designation for Extra-Fine thread series of Standard Unified Screw Threads (ANSI B1.1)
 Union Nationale des Étudiants de France (National Union of Students of France), a French students' union
 United Nations Exploratory Force, a fictional military organization in the science fiction novel The Forever War